Jean Leguay (born 22 August 1955), better known as Jano, is a French comics artist.

Biography
Jano studied fine arts in Paris for three years. His first comic was Kebra in 1978, in collaboration with Bertrand Tramber. It was published in French comic magazines B.D., Métal Hurlant, Charlie Mensuel, Rigolo, L'Echo des Savannes and Zoulou. Kebra is a rat-like character, although Jano's protagonists often defy a correct classification as a certain species. Gazoline, a female humanized cheetah, appeared in Kosmik Komiks in 1983. After a trip to Africa in 1984 Jano created Keubla. His style sometimes is compared to Moebius', but more comical and down-to-earth and with definitely more sex scenes.

In addition to his comics Jano illustrated books for children as well as his own travel experiences. In 2003 Anna Azevedo, Renata Baldo, and Eduardo Souza Lima made the documentary film Rio de Jano, showing Jano exploring Rio de Janeiro.

Gazoline et la planète rouge won the Angoulême International Comics Festival Prize for Best Album in 1990.

Works
(This list tries to list the comics with their initial title - the same comics were published by different publishers under different titles several times.)

Kebra 
 Fait comme un rat 1981
 Kebra chope les boules! 1982
 Le zonard des étoiles 1982
 La honte aux trousses 1983
 Kébra Krado Komix 1985
 Les Aventures de Kébra 1997

Keubla 
 Sur La Piste Du Bongo 1986
 Wallaye! 1987

Other 
 Ça Roule 1983
 Carnet D'afrique 1986
 Gazoline et la planète rouge 1989
 Le Pygmée Géant (by Jean-Luc Fromental) 1997
 Kémi - Le Rat De Brousse 1994
 Les Fabuleuses Dérives de Santa Sardinha 1: 1999, 2: 2003
 Bonjour les Indes (with Dodo and Ben Radis) 1991
 Paname 1997
 Rio de Janeiro 2001

References

External links
 List of Kebra episodes
 Jano in the Comiclopedia
 Jano at bedetheque
 Rio de Jano at IMDb

1955 births
French comics artists
Living people